Aldo Schneider was a Brazilian politician and member of the Brazilian Democratic Movement Party. He was a member of the Legislative Assembly of Santa Catarina in the 17th legislature from 2011 to 2015. In the 2014 elections, he was re-elected as state deputy for the 18th legislature from 2015  to 2019.

Death
His death took place on August 19, 2018, due to complications from a spinal tumor. The Chamber of Deputies of Santa Catarina spent three million reais with the treatment of Aldo Schneider, which led the deputies to vote for the end of health assistance.

References 

1961 births
2018 deaths
Brazilian Democratic Movement politicians
Members of the Legislative Assembly of Santa Catarina